Michael Lansing (born June 13, 1994) is an American professional soccer player who plays as a goalkeeper for Aalesunds FK in the OBOS Ligaen.

Born and raised in Randolph, New Jersey, Lansing played prep soccer at Randolph High School.

Career
Lansing was the starting goalkeeper for the New York Red Bulls U-23 team that won the 2014 NPSL Championship. After graduating from Bucknell University Lansing signed with Vejle Boldklub, who at the time were playing in the Danish 1st Division. Lansing was announced to be signing with AaB six months after moving to Denmark and stayed at Vejle Boldklub for one season in total.

Lansing made his debut for AaB in the Landspokal Cup against FC Roskilde on September 26, 2018. Lansing appeared again in the cup against fellow Superliga club AC Horsens on October 31, 2018, and kept a clean sheet in the 1-0 quarter final victory.

He joined AC Horsens for the 2019–20 season.

References

1994 births
Living people
New York Red Bulls players
Vejle Boldklub players
AaB Fodbold players
Association football goalkeepers
American soccer players
American expatriate soccer players
Expatriate men's footballers in Denmark
People from Randolph, New Jersey
Randolph High School (New Jersey) alumni
Soccer players from New Jersey
Sportspeople from Morris County, New Jersey
Bucknell Bison men's soccer players
American expatriate sportspeople in Denmark
New York Red Bulls U-23 players
National Premier Soccer League players
AC Horsens players
Danish Superliga players
Aalesunds FK players